Men's Super G World Cup 1999/2000

Final point standings

In Men's Super G World Cup 1999/2000 all results count. Hermann Maier won his third Super G World Cup in a row. Austrian athletes won six races out of seven.

References
 fis-ski.com

World Cup
FIS Alpine Ski World Cup men's Super-G discipline titles